Alliance is a professional gaming and esports organization based in Sweden that was formed in April 2013. They have teams in TrackMania, Dota 2, Hearthstone, the Super Smash Bros. series, Fortnite, Apex Legends and VALORANT, and previously had teams in League of Legends and StarCraft II.

In December 2016, the organisation announced that it had become player-owned after parting with its parent organisation, GoodGame agency which was owned by Amazon through its subsidiary Twitch. The Dota 2 team won The International 2013, then the largest single prize money payout in esports history. The League of Legends team is one of the five teams that won a season of European League of Legends Championship Series with Fnatic, G2 Esports, Mad Lions and Rogue.

History 
The organization was founded in April 2013, picking up the Dota 2 team No Tidehunter as well as StarCraft II player Naniwa.

The organization expanded into League of Legends in December 2013, which competed in European League of Legends Championship Series. They entered Super Smash Bros. in November 2014 with the signing of Armada, a Fox and Peach player.

Alliance left StarCraft II in July 2014 with the release of their last player, SortOf. The League of Legends team was rebranded as Elements in January 2015 due to the team ownership rules in the League of Legends Championship Series preventing GoodGame Agency from owning multiple teams.

On 12 December 2016, Twitch spun Evil Geniuses and Alliance into player-owned organizations. According to Alliance member Jonathan Berg, all original members in addition to Armada got a percentage of the company.

Dota 2 

A few months after being picked up by Alliance, the Dota 2 team won The International 2013, defeating former TI champions Natus Vincere in the grand finals 3–2. The team finished the group stages with a perfect 14–0 record, and only lost 3 games throughout the whole tournament (losing 1 game to Team DK, and the aforementioned 2 games to Na'Vi).

At The International 2014, the defending champions failed to make it out of the group stages, finishing tied for 11th place with a 6–9 record. After the tournament, their long stable roster fell apart, with the departure of Gustav "s4" Magnusson, Henrik "AdmiralBulldog" Ahnberg, and Jerry "EGM" Lundkvist.

While Starladder i-League is ongoing, Alliance announce the departure of MyNuts and use Kebap as a Standin for their series against Virtus.Pro

The team welcomes their previous teammate EGM back to Alliance

They would go on to win both WCA, the biggest prize pool event that was not directed by Valve, beating LGD in a best of 5; with a score of 3–2. Following this they went to Starladder almost missing the tournament due to weather complications. Despite a rocky start the team beat out TI reigning champions Evil Geniuses 2–0 in a best of three in the final. After their back to back victories at lans the team decided to drop out of the upcoming tournaments and focus on the Shanghai Major.

The team split up after the sixth rendition of the International, which resulted in AdmiralBulldog retiring to pursue streaming full-time, and Akke retiring to pursue a career in programing and S4 joining OG. S4 went on to win the Boston Major and the Kiev major, after leaving Alliance for OG.

The post TI6-shuffle squad featured former Ninjas in Pajamas players Limmp, Handsken and Jonassomfan as well as Loda and EGM. This squad had mediocre success failing to qualify for any major events during the TI6-TI7 season; ultimately leading to EGM being kicked on the last day of the "Drop period" before TI7 rosters had to be locked. They picked up Pablo as his replacement. After The International 2017, for which Alliance did not qualify, the team announced that they would part ways with its players Simon “Handsken” Haag, Linus “Limmp” Blomdin and Jonas “jonassomfan” Lindholm.

League of Legends 
The Alliance League of Legends team formed in December 2013, and was granted the spot vacated by Evil Geniuses in the European League of Legends Championship Series due to Evil Geniuses moving to the North American LCS.

2014 
In the Spring Split, Alliance finished 3rd in the regular season with a 16–12 record, behind SK Gaming and Fnatic. Alliance mid-laner Henrik “Froggen” Hansen was voted as the MVP of the Spring Split with 28% of the vote. In the playoffs, they finished 4th, losing to Fnatic in the semifinals 2–1, then lost to ROCCAT 2–0 in the 3rd place game.

In the Summer Split, Alliance topped the regular season standings with a 21–7 record. They then won the playoffs with a 3–1 over Fnatic in the finals, giving the team a spot in the 2014 League of Legends World Championship. At the World Championship, Alliance finished 3rd in their group, failing to advance to the knockout stage. The team was upset by Brazilian team KaBuM! e-Sports, which denied them a chance to play in a tiebreaker for a chance to progress to the knockout stage.

At Intel Extreme Masters San Jose, the team was eliminated by Cloud9.

The team picked up Martin "Rekkles" Larsson on 24 November 2014. After a Riot Games rules change concerning sponsorship, Alliance LoL left the organization and rebranded itself as Elements.

2015 
Elements was created in January 2015 from the League of Legends roster of Alliance after rebranding itself due to a new sale of sponsorships rule established after the 2014 season. The initial starting roster of Elements included Wickd, Shook, Froggen, Rekkles, and Nyph.

After a 4–4 record at the end of the fourth week of the spring split, Elements replaced Wickd with former Millenium top laner Kevin "kev1n" Rubiszewski. In the sixth week of the split they replaced Nyph with former Evil Geniuses support Krepo, who had previously played with Froggen on CLG.EU and EG. Nyph stayed in the team as an assistant coach. One week later, Wickd returned to the toplane position while kev1n became a sub. Nyph replaced Mart as the new head coach, joining the team during the picks and bans.

Elements went 7–11 in the EU Spring LCS regular season to finish 7th, failing to make the playoffs.

Rekkles left the team in April and was replaced at AD Carry by Erik “Tabzz” Van Helvert.

Elements changed four of the players on the roster for the Summer 2015 Split.

In early May 2016, German football club FC Schalke 04 bought Element's LCS spot.

Roster

Dota 2

Trackmania

Apex Legends

Super Smash Bros. Melee

Fortnite

VALORANT

Organization

Management

References

External links
 Official website

Esports teams based in Sweden
2013 establishments in Sweden
Defunct and inactive FIFA (video game series) teams
Former European League of Legends Championship Series teams
Dota teams
Super Smash Bros. player sponsors
StarCraft teams
Amazon (company)
 
Player-owned esports teams
Esports teams established in 2013